David Christie may refer to:

 David Christie (footballer, born 1885) (fl. 1907–1909), Scottish footballer (Manchester United)
 David Christie (1930s footballer) (fl. 1936–1939), Scottish footballer (Queen's Park)
 David Christie (politician) (1818–1880), Liberal member of the Canadian Senate from 1867 to 1880
 David Christie (singer) (1948–1997), French singer
 Davy Christie (1867–1945), Scottish footballer (Stoke FC)